Geytin is an annual Faroese film festival in the Nordic House in Tórshavn where two Geytin film prizes are handed. The festival was established in 2012. The prizes are given to a Faroese film instructor for a short film, which is no longer than 30 minutes.

The name of the Geytin-award 
The main prize is named after Herálvur Geyti, who was better known as Geytin. Geytin travelled around the Faroe Islands in 1960s and 1970s, before cinemas or TV were common in the islands.

The two film awards 
There are two prizes, both are handed at en event in the Nordic House. From 2012 until 2016 they were handed in December, since 2018 they have been handed in February. The main prize, Geytin, is 30 000 DKK and a statuette, depicting the original person Geytin, the statuette is designed by Astrid Andreassen and Dávur Geyti. The other prize is 25 000 DKK and is given by Tórshavn City Council, it is an audience award, where the audience decides which film is winning. The first time the prizes were handed was on 11 December 2012 at a film festival called Geytin, in the Nordic House in Tórshavn where all the nominated films were shown. Sakaris Stórá from Skopun won the first Geytin film prize for the short movie for Summarnátt (Summer Night), and Annika á Lofti won the  Audience Award (Faroese: Áskoðaravirðislønin) for the film Mist.

Award winners

Winners of Geytin 
2012 - Summarnátt, director: Sakaris Stórá
2013 - Terminal, director: Dávur Djurhuus
2014 - Skuld, director: Heiðrikur á Heygum
2015 - Stina Karina, director: Andrias Høgenni
2016 - Et knæk, director: Andrias Høgenni
2018 - 111 góðir dagar, director: Trygvi Danielsen
2019 - Ikki illa meint, director: Andrias Høgenni
2020 - Hví eru vit her?, directors: Búi Dam & Dánjal á Neystabø

Winners of the Audience Award (Áskoðaravirðislønin) 
2012 - Mist,  director: Annika á Lofti
2013 - Munch, director: Jónfinn Stenberg
2014 - Skuld, director: Heiðrikur á Heygum (Skuld means Guilt)
2015 - Tunnan, directors: Jónfinn Stenberg and Jóannes Lamhauge (Tunnan means the Barrel)
2016 - Et knæk, director: Andrias Høgenni
2018 - Maðurin við Blæuni, director: Maria Tórgarð
2019 - Omman, director: Julia í Kálvalíð
2020 - Trøllabeiggi, director: Gudmund Helmsdal

Nominated films

Nominated films in 2020 

The films are from 2019.
Við fyrsta eygnabrá - Esther á Fjallinum - (11:30 min.)
Verkir (episode 1 of 3) - Theresa Jákupsdóttir & Karina Jákupsdóttir - (23:29 min.)
Hví eru vit her? - Búi Dam & Dánjal á Neystabø - (22:00 min.)
Ósøgd orð - Young people from the sommer film school Nóllywood 2019 - (9:49 min.)
Trøllabeiggi - Gudmund Helmsdal - (30:00 min.)
The River - Atli Brix Kamban 2019 - (3:31 min.)
Smoothie Baby - Young people from the sommer film school Nóllywood 2019, short animation film - (1:40 min.)
Vit/Kenslur - Young people from the sommer film school Nóllywood 2019, documentary - (13:53 min.)

Nominated films in 2019 
12 - Hanna Davidsen and Mikkjal Davidsen.
Góðastova - Maria Guldbrandsø Tórgarð
Omman - Julia í Kálvalíð
Ikki illa meint - Andrias Høgenni
Julians Stigi - Atli Brix Kamban
Annika - Heiðrik á Heygum
Tyggigummi - Gudmund Helmsdal
Et visit - Sára Wang

Nominated films in 2018 
The awards were handed on 24 February 2018.
Myndamálarin - Gudmund Helmsdal
111 góðir dagar - Trygvi Danielsen
Skóhorn(y) - Sóley Danielsen og Gudmund Helmsdal
Fisherman - Franklin Henriksen
Frosthvarv - Franklin Henriksen
Maðurin við Blæuni - Maria Tórgarð
Collision Course - Rói Davidsen
Sorte Hunde - Atli Brix Kamban
Wünder Pitsa - Hanus Johannessen

Nominated films in 2016 
 Óttafet - Nóllywood, short film
 Nattens Stjerner - Atli Brix Kamban, short film
 Frávik - Maria G. Tórgarð, short film
 Bittersweet - Rói Davidsen, short film
 Marra - Hans Kristian Eyðunsson Hansen og Torfinnur Jákupsson, short film
 Ramblers - Hanus Johannessen, short film
 Et knæk - Andrias Høgenni, short film

Nominated films in 2015 
 Alda - Franklin Henriksen and Rúna Ingunardóttir, short film, 7:15 min
 At liva við tí - Ása Pálsdóttir and Rebekka Eliasen, documentary, 10:17 min
 Birting - Leo Lávík, short film, 10:14 min
 Mítt navn er Adam - Rói Davidsen, 3D animation film, 5:30 min
 Gakk tú tryggur - Dávur Djurhuus, short film, 4:00 min
 Tunnan - Jónfinn Stenberg and Jóannes Lamhauge, short film, 28:00 min
 Slitið saman - Sára Wang and Maria Winther Olsen, short film, 8:00 min
 Boys - Sunniva Sundby and Julia í Kálvalíð, documentary, 6:45 min
 Stina Karina - Andrias Høgenni, short film, 10:00 min
 Dalur - Heiðrikur á Heygum, short film, 30:00 min

Nominated films in 2014 
 Risin og Kellingin, stop motion film, Helga Djurhuus 4:23
 Det mand ikke taler om, hybrid-documentary, Andrias Høgenni 25:00
 Just another day, documentary, Petra Eliasardóttir Mikkelsen, 5:51
 Sum einglar vit falla, short film, Maria Winther Olsen, 28:00
 Autopilot, animation film, Rói Davidsen, 6:00
 Gongdin, short film, young people from Nollywood (film workshop in Nólsoy), 5:46
 Kom og dansa, tragic comedy, Andrias Høgenni, 14:00
 Fall for Ewe, poetic documentary, Høgni Mohr & Jens Jákup Hansen, 2:29
 Podróżnik, short film, Franklin Henriksen, 4:48
 Skuld, horror movie, Heiðrikur á Heygum, 30:00

Nominated films in 2013 
Tú, music video - Jóannes Lamhauge
Terminal, short film - Dávur Djurhuus
Eina, short film - Andrias Høgenni
True Love, short film - Heiðrik á Heygum
Vetrarmorgun, short film - Sakaris Stórá
Munsch, short film - Jónfinn Stenberg
Byrta, music profile - Uni L. Hansen
Lítla Ljósið, animation film - Hans Kristian E. Hansen

References 

Awards established in 2012
Faroese film awards
2012 establishments in the Faroe Islands
Winter events in the Faroe Islands